Farhad Kermanshahi (born September 29, 1996) is an Iranian footballer who plays as a goalkeeper for Paykan in the Persian Gulf Pro League.

Club career

Paykan
He made his debut for Paykan in first fixtures of 2021–22 Persian Gulf Pro League against Naft Masjed Soleyman.

References

Living people
1996 births
Association football goalkeepers
Iranian footballers
Gol Gohar players
Sanat Mes Kerman F.C. players
Naft Masjed Soleyman F.C. players
Paykan F.C. players